Jeanne C. Stein is an American urban fantasy author. She now lives in Colorado, but was raised and educated in San Diego, which is the setting for her contemporary vampire fantasy.

Stein's novels about vampire bounty hunter Anna Strong are published by Ace Books, and as S. J. Harper, the Fallen Siren Series is published by ROC.

Bibliography
Jeanne C. Stein is the national bestselling author of the Urban Fantasy series, The Anna Strong Vampire Chronicles and most recently, The Fallen Siren Series written as S. J. Harper. She is active in the writing community, belonging to Rocky Mountain Fiction Writers, Sisters in Crime and Horror Writers of America. There are nine books in the Anna Strong series and two books and two novellas in a new series written with Samantha Sommersby under the S. J. Harper pseudonym. She also has more than a dozen short story credits, including the novella, Blood Debt, from the New York Times bestselling anthology, Hexed (2011) and The NYT bestselling anthology, Dead But Not Forgotten edited by Charlaine Harris (2014.)  Her short stories have been published in collections here in the US and the UK. Her latest, an Anna Strong novella entitled Anna & the Vampire Prince, was recently published by Hex Publishers.

Her books are published in Germany by Droemer/Knaur and Norway (2009).

Anna Strong Series

US titles

The Fallen Siren Series

Cursed (2013)
Captured (2014)
Reckoning (2014
Forsaken (2015)

Novels

 Cloud City, an Anna Strong Novella (2013)
 Wonderland Novella (2014)
 Anna and the Vampire Prince (2017)

German titlesVerführung der Nacht (2008)Lockruf des Blutes (2008)Dunkle Küsse (2009)Der Kuss der Vampirin (Aug 2010)Blutrotes Verlangen'' (Feb 2011)

Anthologies and collections

References

External links
New Official website
Old Official website
Biting Edge Blog
Interview for Penguin Books 
Rocky Mountain Fiction Writers
RMFW'S WRITER OF THE YEAR 2008
Droemer/Knaur

21st-century American novelists
American romantic fiction writers
American women novelists
American bloggers
American fantasy writers
Year of birth missing (living people)
Living people
American mystery writers
American women bloggers
Women science fiction and fantasy writers
Women romantic fiction writers
Women mystery writers
21st-century American women writers
Pseudonymous women writers
21st-century pseudonymous writers